The 2017 Illinois Fighting Illini football team represented the University of Illinois at Urbana–Champaign during the 2017 NCAA Division I FBS football season. The Fighting Illini played their home games at Memorial Stadium in Champaign, Illinois, and competed in the West Division of the Big Ten Conference. They were led by second-year head coach Lovie Smith. They finished the season 2–10, 0–9 in Big Ten play to finish in last place in the West Division.

Recruiting

Position key

Recruits

The Fighting Illini signed a total of 25 recruits.

Schedule
Illinois announced its 2017 football schedule on July 11, 2013. The 2017 schedule consisted of 7 home and 5 away games in the regular season. The Fighting Illini hosted Big Ten foes Indiana, Nebraska, Northwestern, Rutgers, Wisconsin, and traveled to Iowa, Minnesota, Ohio State, and Purdue.

The Fighting Illini hosted two of the three non-conference opponents, Ball State from the Mid-American Conference and Western Kentucky (WKU) from Conference USA, and traveled to South Florida from the American Athletic Conference.

Schedule Source:

Game summaries

Ball State

WKU

at South Florida

Nebraska

at Iowa

Rutgers

at Minnesota

Wisconsin

at Purdue

Indiana

at Ohio State

Northwestern

Roster

References

Illinois
Illinois Fighting Illini football seasons
Illinois Fighting Illini football